The Temperate Northern Atlantic is a biogeographic region of the Earth's seas, comprising the temperate and subtropical waters of the North Atlantic Ocean and connecting seas, including the Mediterranean Sea, Black Sea, and northern Gulf of Mexico.

The Temperate Northern Atlantic is a marine realm, one of the great biogeographic divisions of the world's ocean basins.

The tropical waters of the Atlantic Ocean, Gulf of Mexico, and Caribbean Sea are part of the Tropical Atlantic marine realm. To the north, the Temperate North Atlantic transitions to the Arctic realm.

Subdivisions
The Temperate Northern Atlantic realm is divided into six marine provinces. Five of the provinces are further divided into marine ecoregions. The Black Sea is both a province and an ecoregion.

Northern European Seas
 South and West Iceland
 Faroe Plateau
 Southern Norway
 Northern Norway and Finnmark
 Baltic Sea
 North Sea
 Celtic Seas

Lusitanian
 South European Atlantic Shelf
 Saharan Upwelling
 Azores Canaries Madeira

Mediterranean Sea
 Adriatic Sea
 Aegean Sea
 Levantine Sea
 Tunisian Plateau-Gulf of Sidra
 Ionian Sea
 Western Mediterranean
 Alboran Sea

Black Sea
 Black Sea

Cold Temperate Northwest Atlantic
 Gulf of Saint Lawrence-Eastern Scotian Shelf
 Southern Grand Banks-South Newfoundland
 Scotian Shelf
 Gulf of Maine-Bay of Fundy
 Virginian

Warm Temperate Northwest Atlantic
 Carolinian
 Northern Gulf of Mexico

References

 
Marine realms
Atlantic Ocean